Matija Prskalo (born 25 October 1966) is a Croatian theatre, film and television actress.

Filmography

Television roles 
 Nemoj nikome reći as Anita Jurić (2015-2016)
 Zora dubrovačka as Marijana (2013-2014)
 Stipe u gostima as Anica (2011)
 Vrata do vrata (TV pilot) as Tamara (2009)
 Stipe u gostima as Anica (2009)
 Zauvijek susjedi as Marica (2008)
 Ne daj se, Nina as Pamela Privora (2008)
 Luda kuća as Lidija Devčić (2005-2006)
 Zabranjena ljubav as Stela Vidak (2004-2006)
 Balkan Inc. as Anđela Pauletić (2006)
 Bitange i princeze as sutkinja (2006)
 Milijun eura as voditeljica (2005)
 Naši i vaši as Mila (2002)
 Veliki odmor (2000)

Movie roles 
 Djeca jeseni as učiteljica (2012)
 Cvjetni trg as Mackova žena (2012)
 Nije kraj as Rahmeta (2008)
 Crveno i crno as Beba (2006)
 Accidental Co-Traveller as dadilja (2004)
 The Society of Jesus as Kaštelanova žena (2004)
 Sjaj u očima as Agnes (2003)
 Witnesses as medicinska sestra (2003)
 Duga ponoć as Ivanova žena (2003)
 Queen of the Night as Goca (2001)
 Starci as Hilga (2001)
 Višnje u rakiji (2000)
 Ispovijed koju niste zavrijedili (1999)
 Madonna as novinarka RTB-a (1999)
 When the Dead Start Singing as Cincova kćer (1998)
 Transatlantic (1998)
 How the War Started on My Island as Lucija Milosavljević (1996)
 Zona sudbine (1992)
 Luka (1992)
 Fragments: Chronicle of a Vanishing (1991)
 Ljeto za sjećanje (1990)

References

External links

Website on blogspot.com

1966 births
Living people
Actresses from Zagreb
20th-century Croatian actresses
Croatian stage actresses
Croatian film actresses
Croatian television actresses
21st-century Croatian actresses
Golden Arena winners